Malkinia can refer to:

Malkinia (genus), a genus of bush crickets or katydids in the family Tettigoniidae, subfamily Phaneropterinae
 Three villages in Poland, located in Małkinia Górna Commune (Gmina Małkinia Górna):
Małkinia Dolna
Małkinia Górna
Małkinia Mała-Przewóz